The Afghanistan fighting season refers to the cyclical restarting of fighting every spring during the War in Afghanistan (2001–2021) due to weather and economic factors. It generally ran from April to October and saw more combat deaths than the off-season.

In 2019, the Taliban insurgent group announced that the fighting season—what they called their "spring offensive"—would begin on April 12, after stalling peace talks.

Factors

Afghanistan has a harsh winter and a poor transportation system, leaving many parts of the country snowbound until spring. Many routes into Pakistan, where recruits and weapons come from, are similarly impassable for months. 

Opium poppies are planted beginning in October and harvest begins in April. Manpower that was tied up in the opium trade is freed up for fighting between April and October.

Madrassas in Pakistan go on recess during the spring. New recruits subjected to religious and military training often volunteer to fight in Afghanistan.

See also
Fighting Season - an Australian drama about the Australian War in Afghanistan

Reference
 

Seasons
War in Afghanistan (2001–2021)
21st century in Afghanistan
Taliban
Al-Qaeda